A White ethnostate is a proposed type of state in which residence or citizenship would be limited to whites, and non-whites, such as Blacks, Asians, Jews, Middle Easterners and North Africans and Hispanics would be excluded from citizenship. Within the Anglosphere, the natives of their respective countries would also be excluded from citizenship, such as the Indigenous people of the United States, Canada, Australia and New Zealand.

In the United States, proposals for the establishment of such a state are advanced by White supremacist and White separatist factions such as Ku Klux Klansmen and Neo-Nazis. Some of these factions claim that a certain part of the country should have a white majority and other factions claim that the entire country should have a white majority. Most white ethnostate movements envision a state which will be solely inhabited by White Anglo-Saxon Protestants and/or people who are of Northern European descent.

Historical attempts to establish a white ethnostate include Apartheid-era South Africa, where the black population was pushed into areas which were known as Bantustans through various means, including deportations and racial segregation, with the aim of establishing separate states out of the resulting ethnically cleansed areas, the largest of which would be turned into a white state.

Proposed white ethnostates

North America 

Historically, as well as in modern times, the Pacific Northwest (Washington, Oregon, Idaho and a portion of Montana) has been proposed by many white supremacists as a location for the establishment of a white ethnostate. This Northwest Territorial Imperative was promoted by Richard Girnt Butler, Robert Jay Mathews, David Lane, and Harold Covington, alongside the white supremacist terrorist organization The Order, the Neo-Nazi Christian Identity organization Aryan Nations, the white power skinhead group Volksfront, and the Northwest Front, among others. The Northwest Territorial Imperative also has loose overlap with the Cascadia independence movement, which also seeks to create an independent republic between the Northwest and parts of Northern California in the United States and British Columbia in Canada. Some in the far-right use the term American Redoubt to describe a similar migration to the Northwestern United States.

Other areas have been looked into as sites for a potential white ethnostate by certain groups, most notably, the South has been proposed as a white ethnostate by the self-proclaimed "Southern Nationalist" League of the South (LS), due to the region's history of secessionism and due to the fact that the region was once an independent nation which was known as the Confederate States of America (1861–1865). Another white ethnostate has been proposed by Billy Roper's Shield Wall Network (SWN), a neo-Nazi organization which is based in Mountain View, Arkansas, it seeks to establish a "white ethnostate" in the Ozark region and it is affiliated with other separatist groups such as the Ku Klux Klan (KKK); the Knights Party, located near Harrison, Arkansas; the League of the South (LS); and the National Socialist Movement (NSM), a member of the now-defunct Nationalist Front. Conversely, the Ozarks have been a "hotbed" for adherents of the Christian Identity movement, including the Church of Israel and various members of the Christian Patriot movement who have set up paramilitary training camps in order to prepare for a coming Armageddon. The defunct neo-Nazi organization Traditionalist Worker Party (TWP), led by Matthew Heimbach, also sought to establish a white ethnostate which it named "Avalon", based on the ideological principles of Nazism, various strands of European fascism such as Legionarism, British Fascism, and Eastern Orthodoxy.

South Africa 

After the end of apartheid, some Afrikaner nationalist organizations, including Afrikaner Weerstandsbeweging, started to promote the idea of a Volkstaat that would be established in the Western Cape region.

In January 2010, Beeld, an Afrikaans newspaper, held an online survey. Out of 11,019 respondents, 56% (6,178) stated that they would move to a Volkstaat if one were created, an additional 17% (1,908) stated that they would consider moving to it and 27% (2,933) stated that they would not consider moving to it because they did not believe that it was a viable option.

Historical attempts to create white ethnostates

United States
Historically, white nationalist laws were passed and enforced in the United States, beginning with the passage of the Naturalization Act of 1790, which only allowed whites to apply for citizenship if they had lived in the United States without breaking any laws for two years, and it only continued to recognize whites— with rare exceptions— as citizens for decades afterwards. Only after the American Civil War did laws begin to change, gradually extending citizenship rights to minority populations. Non-white foreigners as of the Johnson–Reed Act in 1924 were allowed to immigrate to America following a quota of 2% of the number of people from their country of origin who were living in America per the 1890 Census. The 1952 McCarran–Walter Act revised the former 1924 act and decreased the percentage of people who were coming to America. It also removed the ban on immigration from Asia. Discrimination in immigration was legally ended by the Immigration and Nationality Act of 1965. In 2013, white supremacist Craig Cobb attempted to take over the small town of Leith, North Dakota, and turn it into a neo-Nazi enclave; this attempt failed due to Cobb's violent behavior towards Leith's residents, which got him arrested. The events form the basis of the documentary Welcome to Leith.

Nazi Germany

Adolf Hitler planned to create a Nordic/Aryan superstate that would rule most of Europe, dominate its geopolitical landscape and eradicate anyone who was not considered "pure" by the Nazis. Nazi Germany's objective was to turn a large part of central and eastern Europe into an "Aryan" homeland by cleansing its population through the genocide and mass deportation of non-Aryans such as Jews, Slavs (i.e. Poles, Serbs, etc.), Roma/Gypsies, and homosexuals.

Organization of Ukrainian Nationalists UPA and OUN-B in Volhynia and Eastern Galicia:

In 1943-1945, forces of the Ukrainian Insurgent Army and the Bandera faction of the Organization of Ukrainian Nationalists, with some support from the local Ukrainian population, committed genocide of around 85,000 Poles (primarily women and children) in the regions of Volhynia and Eastern Galicia that were at that time occupied by the military of Nazi Germany. The aim of the OUN-B and its UPA military organisation was to create a homogenuous Ukrainian ethnostate without the Polish, Russian, Jewish, and Czech minorities that inhabited those lands at the time. The UPA sometimes worked together with the Ukrainian SS under German command to carry out other massacres of Polish minorities.

Australia
From 1901 until the mid-20th century, Australia maintained a series of policies, collectively nicknamed the White Australia policy, that actively restricted the immigration of non-white migrants. The policy originated after the passage of the Immigration Restriction Act 1901, which aimed to ban non-Europeans from migrating to the country. These policies were gradually dismantled over the following years, and the Immigration Restriction Act 1901 was repealed in 1958 and replaced by the Migration Act 1958. The White Australia policy was definitively ended in 1973, after the Whitlam government passed legislation that made selection of migrants on the basis of race unlawful.

New Zealand
Similar to the White Australia Policy, the "White New Zealand Policy" consisted of legislation which banned Asians and other non-Europeans from immigrating to the country. After the Second World War, a memorandum which was published by the Department of External Affairs in 1953 described the purpose of the policy in clearer terms. The laws were not relaxed until the 1970s and 1980s. The Ministry for Culture and Heritage described the policy in the following way: "Our immigration is based firmly on the principle that we are and intend to remain a country of European development. It is inevitably discriminatory against Asians – indeed against all persons who are not wholly of European race and colour. Whereas we have done much to encourage immigration from Europe, we do everything to discourage it from Asia".

South Africa
During the apartheid era, the South African government, led by the National Party, attempted to turn South Africa into a whites-only state by forcing millions of black people to move to areas which it called bantustans. Post-apartheid, some Afrikaner groups such as Afrikaner Weerstandsbeweging (AWB) and Afrikaner Volksfront have promoted the idea of a Volkstaat, an exclusively Afrikaner homeland. The town of Orania, Northern Cape is a manifestation of the Volkstaat idea.

Rhodesia
In November 1965, Ian Smith, the Prime Minister of Southern Rhodesia, declared the independence of Southern Rhodesia in an attempt to preserve white culture by preventing black Africans from ruling the country. Southern Rhodesia became the independent nation of Rhodesia.

See also
White nationalism
White supremacy 
Ethnonationalism
Ethnocracy
Identitarianism
Fourteen Words
Fourth Reich
Harold Covington
 Jamel, Germany is a village known to be heavily populated with neo-Nazis.
Racial nationalism
Racial segregation
White flight

References 

Alt-right
White supremacy
Proposed countries